Sierra de Béjar is a comarca in the province of Salamanca, Castile and León.  It contains the following municipalities:

 Aldeacipreste
 Béjar
 Candelario
 Cantagallo
 El Cerro
 Colmenar de Montemayor
 Cristóbal de la Sierra
 Fresnedoso
 Fuentes de Béjar
 Horcajo de Montemayor
 La Cabeza de Béjar
 La Calzada de Béjar
 La Hoya
 Lagunilla
 Ledrada
 Montemayor del Río
 Nava de Béjar
 Navacarros
 Navalmoral de Béjar
 Peñacaballera
 Peromingo
 Puebla de San Medel
 Puerto de Béjar
 Sanchotello
 Santibáñez de Béjar
 Sorihuela
 Valdefuentes de Sangusín
 Valdehijaderos
 Valdelacasa
 Valdelageve
 Vallejera de Riofrío
 Valverde de Valdelacasa

References 

Comarcas of the Province of Salamanca